Besteiros Parish may refer to:
 Besteiros Parish, Amares
 Besteiros Parish, Paredes